Three hospital ships of the United States Navy have borne the name
USS Mercy, in honor of the virtue of compassion (and owing to their purpose).

 , was built in 1907 as Saratoga and was commissioned Mercy (ID-1305) on 24 January 1918, before being re-designated AH-4 in 1920. She served in the Atlantic Fleet during World War I.
 , was a  commissioned on 7 August 1944. She served during World War II.
 , was placed in service in 1986 and served during the Gulf War, as well as numerous Humanitarian Assistance Missions. She is currently in active service.

See also
 

United States Navy ship names